Dale MacKay is a Canadian chef and the winner of the first season of Top Chef Canada in 2011.

MacKay first entered the food industry as a fry cook in Vancouver, British Columbia. In the early 2000s, he moved to London, England, where he got a job at Gordon Ramsay's Claridge's, later moving to other Ramsay restaurants in London, Tokyo and New York City. He later became executive chef at Daniel Boulud's Lumière restaurant in Vancouver, following the departure of Rob Feenie from the establishment in 2007, until its closure in 2011.

He opened his own pair of restaurants, ensemble and ensembleTap, in 2011. He won the Top Chef Canada title soon afterward, investing his prize money in the venues, but closed them in 2012 after determining that rental costs in downtown Vancouver were too expensive for them to become profitable.

He made a return appearance on Top Chef Canada in 2013, acting as sous chef to third season finalist Danny Francis.

In early 2013, MacKay announced that he was returning to his hometown of Saskatoon, Saskatchewan to open a new restaurant. The restaurant, named Ayden Kitchen & Bar, opened on November 15, 2013. He is also owner of three other restaurants: Little Grouse on the Prairie (Italian), Sticks and Stones (Korean) and Avenue Restaurant in Regina. He also owned a short-lived pizzeria, Home Slice Pizza Shoppe.

MacKay competed on the second season of Iron Chef Gauntlet, where he was eliminated in the second round.

In 2019 he began appearing as a rotating judge on the BBQ competition series Fire Masters, which airs in Canada on Food Network and in the US on Cooking Channel.

In 2020 he appeared as a judge on the Food Network competition series Wall of Chefs.

Filmography

References

External links
Grass Roots Restaurant Group

Canadian male chefs
Living people
People from Vancouver
People from Saskatoon
Participants in Canadian reality television series
Top Chef winners
Year of birth missing (living people)